Megahertz may refer to:

 1,000,000 Hertz (the SI unit of frequency)
 Megahertz (horse), a Thoroughbred racehorse
 Megahertz (record producer), American record producer, composer and songwriter
 Megahertz Stakes, American Thoroughbred horse race, named after the horse
 Megaherz, a German band